Enrique Martínez (13 July 1930 – 24 March 2021) was a Spanish equestrian. He competed at the 1960 Summer Olympics, the 1964 Summer Olympics and the 1972 Summer Olympics.

References

1930 births
2021 deaths
Spanish male equestrians
Olympic equestrians of Spain
Equestrians at the 1960 Summer Olympics
Equestrians at the 1964 Summer Olympics
Equestrians at the 1972 Summer Olympics
Sportspeople from Valencia